Palmyra is a town in Morgan Township, Harrison County, Indiana, United States. The population was 930 at the 2010 census.

History
Palmyra was originally called Carthage, and under the latter name was laid out in 1836. Because there was already another Carthage in Indiana, the town was renamed Palmyra in 1839 to avoid repetition. The present name most likely is a transfer from the ancient city of Palmyra.

A Confederate force led by Brigadier General John Hunt Morgan camped in Palmyra on the night of July 9, 1863 after the Battle of Corydon. The army took ransoms from the businesses and commandeered all the town's horses for the Confederate cavalry. The army left the town on the morning of July 10, riding north towards Salem. The town had two previous names: McClellan's Crossroad and Carthage.

Geography
Palmyra is located at  (38.407458, -86.110636).

Government
Palmrya has a three-member Town Council and a Clerk Treasurer. In 2011 the town board consisted  Alvin Brown, Paul Eveslage, and Virginia Kirkham. The Clerk-Treasurer is Tiffany Cardwell. The President of the Town Board was Alvin Brown from 2008 to 2010, who previously served as a Harrison County Councilman for 16 years. Alvin Brown lost his re-election but in 2015 and died in 2018 at the age of 76. Paul Eveslage retired and did not run for reelection in 2015, he passed in December 2015 at the age of 86.  Virginia Kirkham was elected Board President for 2011. In 2015 the town reelected Virginia Kirkam for another term, the new members elected were Mike Shireman and Kerry Ingle. The New Clerk treasurer was Debra Jones.

Demographics

2010 census
As of the census of 2010, there were 930 people, 388 households, and 261 families residing in the town. The racial makeup of the town was 96.1% White, 0.1% African American, 0.2% Native American, 1.6% Asian, and 1.9% from two or more races. Hispanic or Latino of any race were 1.0% of the population.

There were 388 households, of which 35.6% had children under the age of 18 living with them, 48.7% were married couples living together, 12.6% had a female householder with no husband present, 5.9% had a male householder with no wife present, and 32.7% were non-families. 28.1% of all households were made up of individuals, and 11.4% had someone living alone who was 65 years of age or older. The average household size was 2.40 and the average family size was 2.90.

The median age in the town was 37.4 years. 24.2% of residents were under the age of 18; 9.4% were between the ages of 18 and 24; 27.2% were from 25 to 44; 24.7% were from 45 to 64; and 14.4% were 65 years of age or older. The gender makeup of the town was 48.0% male and 52.0% female.

2000 census
As of the census of 2000, there were 633 people, 238 households, and 169 families residing in the town. The racial makeup of the town was 98.42% White, 0.16% Asian, and 1.42% from two or more races.

There were 238 households, out of which 36.1% had children under the age of 18 living with them, 59.2% were married couples living together, 8.8% had a female householder with no husband present, and 28.6% were non-families. 23.1% of all households were made up of individuals, and 10.5% had someone living alone who was 65 years of age or older. The average household size was 2.63 and the average family size was 3.12.

In the town, the population was spread out, with 26.9% under the age of 18, 8.4% from 18 to 24, 31.6% from 25 to 44, 19.3% from 45 to 64, and 13.9% who were 65 years of age or older. The median age was 35 years. For every 100 females, there were 95.4 males. For every 100 females age 18 and over, there were 96.2 males.

The median income for a household in the town was $36,964, and the median income for a family was $42,083. Males had a median income of $30,000 versus $22,321 for females. The per capita income for the town was $15,114. About 4.7% of families and 7.8% of the population were below the poverty line, including 4.5% of those under age 18 and 6.7% of those age 65 or over.

Education
Palmyra has a public library, a branch of the Harrison County Public Library.
The public school district serving the area is the North Harrison Community Schools Corporation.  Residents feed into Morgan Elementary school, North Harrison Middle School, and North Harrison High School.  Morgan Elementary is located just south of the town and houses grades Kindergarten through 5th grades; North Harrison Middle and High are located in nearby Ramsey.

References

Towns in Harrison County, Indiana
Towns in Indiana
Louisville metropolitan area
Populated places established in 1836
1836 establishments in Indiana